The Collector is a 1963 novel by John Fowles.

The Collector(s) may also refer to:

Film
The Collector (1965 film), a film based on Fowles's novel, starring Terence Stamp and Samantha Eggar
The Collector (1997 film), a Finnish film by Auli Mantila
The Collector (2002 film), a Canadian film directed by Jean Beaudin
The Collector (2004 film), a Danish film
The Collector (2005 film), a Polish film directed by Feliks Falk
The Collector (2009 film), a horror film directed by Marcus Dunstan 
The Collector (2012 film), a romantic film starring Rudolf Martin
The Collectors (1999 film), a television film starring Casper Van Dien
The Collector, a fictional character in Mad Max: Beyond Thunderdome

Television
The Collector (Canadian TV series), a Canadian supernatural drama
The Collector (Serbian TV series), a science fiction series
The Collectors (TV series), a British drama series
"The Collector" (The Dead Zone), an episode
The Collector, a fictional character in the American animated series Bonkers
The Collector, a character from the animated fantasy series The Owl House
skekLach the Collector, a villain from The Dark Crystal: Age of Resistance

Literature
The Collectors (novel), a novel by David Baldacci
The Collector, a 2013 novel by Victoria Scott
"The Collector", a short story by Kelley Armstrong
The Collector, a fictional character in Simon R. Green's novel series Nightside

Music
The Collectors (Canadian band), a 1960s Canadian psychedelic rock band that became Chilliwack
The Collectors (album), 1968
The Collectors (Japanese band), a Japanese mod rock band
The Collectors #1, a 2002 album by Dickey Betts & Great Southern
The Collector (album), by Andreas Johnson, 2007
"The Collector", a song by Nine Inch Nails from With Teeth, 2005

Video games
The 7th Guest 3: The Collector, an unreleased sequel to the computer game The 7th Guest
Azetlor the Collector, a villain in Ghostbusters: The Video Game
The Collector, the main villain in LittleBigPlanet
The Collectors, a fictional insectoid race in Mass Effect 2

People
 Robert Berdella (1949–1992), also known as The Collector, American serial killer

See also
La Collectionneuse (lit. The Collector), a 1967 French film directed by Eric Rohmer
The Collector Collector, a 1997 novel by Tibor Fischer
Collector (disambiguation)